Yane Ivanov Sandanski (originally spelled in older Bulgarian orthography ) (18 May 1872 – 22 April 1915), was a Macedonian Bulgarian revolutionary. He is recognized as a national hero in both Bulgaria and North Macedonia.

In his youth Sandanski was interested in Bulgarian politics and had a career as head of the local prison in Dupnitsa. Then he was involved in the anti-Ottoman struggle, joining initially the Supreme Macedonian-Adrianople Committee (SMAC), but later switched to the Internal Macedonian-Adrianople Revolutionary Organisation (IMARO). Sandanski became one of the leaders of the IMARO in the Serres revolutionary district and head of the left wing of the organisation. He supported the idea of a Balkan Federation, and Macedonia as an autonomous state within its framework, as an ultimate solution of the national problems in the area. During the Second Constitutional Era he became an Ottoman politician and entrepreneur, collaborating with the Young Turks and founded the Bulgarian People's Federative Party. Sandanski took up arms on the side of Bulgaria during the Balkan Wars (1912–13). Finally he was involved in Bulgarian public life again, but was eventually killed by the rivalling IMARO right-wing faction activists.

Sandanski's legacy remains disputed among Bulgarian and Macedonian historiography today. Macedonian historians refer to him in an attempt to demonstrate the existence of Macedonian nationalism or at least proto-nationalism within a part of the local revolutionary movement at his time. Despite the allegedly "anti-Bulgarian" autonomism and federalism of Sandanski, it is unlikely he had developed Macedonian national identity in a narrow sensе, or he regarded the Bulgarian Exarchists in Ottoman Macedonia as a separate nation from Bulgarians. Contrary to the assertions of Skopje, his "separatism" represented a supranational project, not national. More, the compatriots, who convinced Sandanski to accept such leftist ideas, were Bulgarian socialists, most of whom were non-Macedonian in origin. The designation Macedonian then was an umbrella term covering different nationalities in the area and when applied to the Slavic speakers in Ottoman Macedonia, it denoted mainly the then Bulgarian ethnic community there. However, contrary to Bulgarian assertions, his ideas of a separate Macedonian political entity, have stimulated the subsequent development of Macedonian nationalism.

As initial member of the SMAC, which served directly the Bulgarian governmental interests, and then of the left wing of the IMRO, which advocated the creation of a Balkan Federation, Yane Sandanski remains one of the most controversial Bulgarian revolutionaries. While the Bulgarian communist authorities mostly liked him for his leftist sympathies, after the fall of communism he is described by some nationalist historians as a betrayer of the Bulgarian national interests in Macedonia. Sandanski is portrayed by them as an Ottomanist, and collaborationist of the Young Turks, seen as Bulgarian enemies, and as the man who started the fratricidal war into the IMRO. He has been accused also of being transformed himself from a revolutionary into a businessperson whose political motivation became only the money earning. On the contrary, in North Macedonia, the positive connotation of him, created in the times of Communist Yugoslavia is still alive. Since then the Macedonian historiography has emphasized the particularity of the IMRO's left wing, while in fact Yugoslav communism and Macedonian nationalism are closely related. Thus, he is portrayed by the Macedonian historians as a freedom fighter against the “Greater Bulgarian chauvinism” and the “Turkish yoke”.  Sandanski has been also claimed recently by some Aromanians as an alleged compatriot, who sought only a limited autonomy for Macedonia in a business deal with the Ottoman Turks.

Biography 
Sandanski was born on 18 May 1872 in the village of Vlahi, near Kresna, then in the Ottoman Empire. His father Ivan participated in the Kresna–Razlog Uprising as a standard-bearer. In 1879, after the crush of the uprising, his family moved to Dupnitsa, in the recently established Principality of Bulgaria, where Sandanski received his elementary education. From 1892 to 1894 he was a soldier in the Bulgarian Army. Sandanski was an active supporter of Radoslavov's wing of the Liberal Party and shortly after it came to power in February 1899, he was appointed head of the Dupnitsa prison. Because of that, his name "Sandanski" distorted from "Zindanski" that comes from Turkish "Zindancı" (lit. Dungeon Keeper or Jailer). 
Yane Sandanski was involved in the Revolutionary Movement in Macedonia and Thrace and became one of its leaders. He joined initially the Supreme Macedonian-Adrianople Committee (SMAC) in 1895 during the Committee's cheta action into the Pomaks-inhabited regions of the Western Rhodopes. In 1897 in Dupnitsa, a new detachment of the Supreme Committee was formed, under the leadership of Krastyo Zahariev, where Sandanski joined too. After the detachment entered Pirin Mountains, it encountered Ottoman troops. In one of the battles Sandanski was wounded and his older brother Todor, who was also in this detachment, returned him to Bulgaria for treatment. In the next years, Sandanski was a SMAC activist in the Pirin region, but in 1900 returned to become a director of the local prison in Dupnitsa. In 1901, Sandanski switched to the Internal Macedono-Adrianopolitan Revolutionary Organization (IMARO). He built up the organization’s network of committees in the districts of Serres and Gorna Dzhumaja in the Pirin region, and that is why the people gave him the nickname "Pirin Tsar" (Pirinski Tsar). He was also one from the organizers of the Miss Stone Affair - America's first modern hostage crisis. On September 3, 1901, a Protestant missionary named Ellen Stone set out on horseback across the mountainous hinterlands of Macedonia and was ambushed by a band of armed revolutionaries. Sandanski was also active in the anti-Ottoman Ilinden-Preobrazhenie Uprising. The Militias active in the region of Serres, led by Yane Sandanski and an insurgent detachment of the Macedonian Supreme Committee, held down a large Turkish force. These actions began on the day of the Feast of the Cross and did not involve the local population as much as in other regions, but were well to the east of Monastir and to the west of Thrace.

The failure of the Ilinden insurrection resulted in the eventual split of the IMARO into a left (federalist) faction in the Seres and Strumica districts and a right-wing faction (centralists) in the Bitola, Salonica and Uskub districts. The left-wing faction opposed Bulgarian nationalism and advocated the creation of a Balkan Socialist Federation with equality for all subjects and nationalities. The centralist faction of IMARO, moved towards Bulgarian nationalism as its regions became incursed of Serb and Greek armed bands, which started infiltrating Macedonia after 1903. The years 1905–1907 saw the split between the two factions, when in 1907 Todor Panitsa killed the right-wing activists Boris Sarafov and Ivan Garvanov in order of Sandanski. The Kjustendil congress of the right faction of the Internal Macedonian Revolutionary Organization (IMRO) in 1908, sentenced Sandanski to death, and led to a final disintegration of the organization.

After the Young Turk Revolution in 1908 and during the Second Constitutional Era Sandanski (in association with Hristo Chernopeev, Chudomir Kantardziev, Aleksandar Buynov and others) contacted the Young Turks and started legal operation. After the disintegration of IMARO, they tried to set up the Macedonian-Adrianople Revolutionary Organization (MORO). Later, the congress for MORO's official inauguration failed and Sandanski and Chernopeev started to work towards a creation of one of the left political parties in the Ottoman Empire – People's Federative Party (Bulgarian Section), whose headquarters was in Solun. This federalist project was supposed to include different ethnic sections in itself, but this idea failed and the only section that was created was the faction of Sandanski, called Bulgarian section. In this way its activists only "revived" their Bulgarian national identification, as Sandanski's faction advocated the particular interests of the "Bulgarian nationality" in the Empire. In 1909 the group around Sandanski and Chernopeev participated in the rally of the Young Turks to Istanbul that led to the deposition of sultan Abdul Hamid II from the throne. Sandanski dreamed about the creation of a Balkan Federative Republic according to the plans of the Balkan Socialist Federation and Macedonia as a part of that Federation. He demanded that the IMARO should embrace all nationalities in the region, not only Bulgarians.

In this way it would be possible to create a healthy system aimed at the organisation of a mass uprising. Later Sandanski and his faction actively supported the Bulgarian army in the Balkan wars of 1912–1913, initially with the idea, that their duty is to fight for autonomous Macedonia,  but later fighting for Bulgaria.   Οbserving the atrocity of Serbs over the local population, former IMRO members began restoration of the organizational network. In the same period a group around Petar Chaulev began negotiations with the Albanian revolutionaries. The temporary Albanian government proposed to them a common revolt to be organized and risen. The negotiations from the part of the Organization had to be carried by Petar Chaulev. The Bulgarian government believed however, that it would not come to a new war with Serbia, so it did not attend the negotiations. However, later, in June 1913 the Bulgarian government sent in Tirana Yane Sandanski for new negotiations. He gave an interview for the Italian newspaper "Il Secolo", where he said that he came to agreement with the Albanians and that from the Bulgarian side there would be organized bands and assaults. So he helped the preparation of the Ohrid-Debar Uprising, organised jointly by IMRO and the Albanians of Western Macedonia. After the wars, Pirin Macedonia was ceded in 1913 to Bulgaria and Sandanski resettled again in the Kingdom where he was killed in 1915 by his political opponents.

Controversy 
The Macedonian liberation movement consisted of three major factions. Led by his excessive ambitions, Sandanski came into conflict with the majority — the Centralists in IMARO and the Varhovists. Although initially a member of the Bulgarian nationalistic Varhovists band, later Yane Sandanski and his Serres group (the Federalists) proclaimed a fight for an autonomous Macedonia which was to be included in a Balkan Socialist Federation. In this manner, the policy of Sofia was completely identified to the adversary character of Athens and Belgrade. The activists of Serres nonetheless stipulated that the Macedonian Question could not be resolved if it is formulated as a part of a Bulgarian national question.  After the Ilinden Uprising, this Group insisted on cooperation with all ethnic and religious groups in the Ottoman Empire and envisioned the inclusion of Macedonia and the district of Adrianople in a Balkan Federation. However the idea of Macedonian autonomy was strictly political and did not imply a secession from Bulgarian ethnicity, even as it was seen at a later stage of the struggle by the group around Sandanski, that espoused a number of classical liberal ideas intermingled with socialism, imported from Bulgaria.

On the other hand, the bigger fraction (the Centralists), as well as that of the other revolutionary organization - Macedonian Supreme Committee - Varhovists, (most of which followers joined the "Centralists", after its dissolution in 1903) aimed also at autonomy. But they did not expected inclusion in a Balkan Socialist Federation and had not so extreme policy by their relation to Sofia. These political differences led to sharp conflict between them.

Arguably Sandanski's greatest sin in the context of the whole movement were the assassinations of the vojvod Michail Daev and later of Ivan Garvanov and Boris Sarafov, both members of the IMARO's Central Committee. He came to regret these and other murders later. Because of that he was even sentenced to death by the Centralists. The Bulgarian authorities investigated the assassinations and suspected Sandanski was the main force behind them. On the other hand, he was amnestied by the Bulgarian Parliament after the support he gave to the Bulgarian Army during the Balkan wars. 

There was, a long history of friction between the Bulgarian Exarchate and the Organization, since those more closely connected with the Exarchate were moderates rather than revolutionaries. Thus the two bodies had never been able to see eye to eye on a number of important issues touching the  population in Thrace and Macedonia. In his regular reports to the Exarch, the Bulgarian bishop in Melnik usually referred to Yane as the wild beast and deliberately spelt his name without capital letters. Despite being an extreme leftist, he had never rejected the Bulgarian Exarchate as an institution, or denied that it had a role to play in the life of the Macedonian Bulgarians. Sandanski also collaborated later with the Young Turks, opposing other factions of IMARO, which fought against the Ottoman authorities in this period.
 

During the first days of Young Turk Revolution, the collaboration of the Macedonian leftists with the Ottoman activists was stated in a special Manifesto to all the nationalities of the Empire. The loyalty to the Empire declared by Sandanski deliberately blurred the distinction between Macedonian and Ottoman political agenda. This ideological transition was quite smooth as long as the rhetoric of Macedonian autonomist supra-nationalism was already quite close to the Ottomanist idea of the so-called unity of the elements. During the honeymoon of Serres revolutionaries and Ottoman authorities, it was the internationalist ideas of Bulgarian socialist activists that left their stamp on Sandanski's agenda: what was seen as national interests had to be subdued to the pan-Ottoman ones in order to achieve a supra-national union of all the nationalities within a reformed Empire. After Bulgaria lost the Balkan Wars and as result most of Macedonia was ceded to Greece and Serbia, Sandanski attempted to organize the assassination of Bulgarian Tsar Ferdinand I, but it failed. He and his wing officially supported then the Russophiles from the Democratic Party.

The Centralists organised several unsuccessful assassination attempts against Sandanski. They came closest to achieving their goal in Thessaloniki, where Tane Nikolov managed to kill two other Federalists and heavily wounded Sandanski. Eventually, Sandanski was killed near the Rozhen Monastery on April 22, 1915, while travelling from Melnik to Nevrokop, by local IMARO activists.

Legacy 

While Sandanski's legacy remains disputed among Bulgarian and Macedonian historiography, there have been attempts among international scholars to reconcile his conflicting and controversial activity. According to the Turkish professor of history Mehmet Hacısalihoğlu, who is interested  in nation-building in the late Ottoman Empire, it is very difficult to find a definitive answers to some ticklish questions related to Sandanski's biography. Hacısalihoğlu's opinion is that Sandanski was de facto a betrayer of the national Bulgarian interests in Macedonia, collaborating with the Young Turks, supporting the idea of the autonomy of the region into the Ottoman Empire, and opposing its incorporation into Bulgaria. That would allow him to maintain his political role, as one of the native leaders in the region. However, this does not mean, he regarded the Bulgarian Macedonian population as a separate Macedonian nation. Also, all the main ideologists, who indoctrinated Sandanski with these leftist ideas, were socialists from Bulgaria proper. Mercia MacDermott who is author of a biographical book on Sandanski, has admitted she has had a real battle over such controversial figure. Nevertheless, she has described him as Bulgarian revolutionary, who under the influence of leftist ideas, tried to solve the Macedonian Question by uniting all the Balkan peoples. 

As a whole, during the early 20th century the idea of a separate Macedonian identity was promoted only by small circles of intellectuals, but the majority of the Slavic people in Macedonia considered themselves to be Bulgarians. The turn-of-the-century Internal Macedonian Revolutionary Organization, was in fact a largely pro-Bulgarian oriented and its members had ethnic Bulgarian identity, including Sandaski.

The IMRO right-wing publicist Hristo Silyanov provides a position of Sandanski’s where he states that the solution of the Macedonian question is not the unity with Bulgarians, and that the Macedonian population had to emancipate itself as a self-determining (or an independent) people. However Siljanov described all IMARO revolutionaries as Bulgarians and used the term Macedonian only as regional designation.

In North Macedonia Sandanski is considered a national hero and one of the most prominent revolutionary figures of the 20th century. However some Macedonian mainstream specialists on the history of local revolutionary movement, like Academician Ivan Katardžiev and PhD. Zoran Todorovski, argue that the political separatism of Sandanski represented a form of early Macedonian nationalism, asserting that at that time it was only a political phenomenon, without ethnic character. Both define all Macedonian revolutionaries from that period as Bulgarians, as products of the Bulgarian educational system, Bulgarian Army military training and Bulgarian Church spiritual impact, which had a policy of producing “Bulgarian national consciousness”. According to them Macedonian identity arose mostly after the First World War and Sandanski identified himself as Bulgarian too. Dimitrija Čupovski under the pseudonym Strezo writes that Sandanski was a Bulgarian agent, bodyguard of the Bulgarian prince and an ordinary criminal.

The IMRO right-wing publicist Stoyan Boyadziev has described Sandanski as extremely controversial Bulgarian revolutionary, whose separatist асtivitу however, produced as a whole Macedonian nationalism. Today, Sandanski is one of the names mentioned in the National anthem of North Macedonia. In Bulgaria the communist regime appreciated Sandanski because of his socialist ideas and honoured him by renaming the town Sveti Vrach to Sandanski, in 1949. In the years after the Fall of Communism some right-wing Bulgarian historians have been keen to discredit his reputation. Sandanski Point on the E coast of Ioannes Paulus II Peninsula, Livingston Island, Antarctica was named after him by the Bulgarian Antarctic Expedition.

Notes

References

Further reading

 Mercia MacDermott. For Freedom and Perfection. The Life of Yane Sandansky, 1988, Published by Journeyman, London, OCLC 16465550 
 Memoirs of Yane Sandanski (original edition in Bulgarian)
 Pavel Deliradev: Jane Sandanski (Biography, 1946)
 Hristo Konstantinov: The Chieftain (Jane Sandanski) (Biography, 1939)

1872 births
1915 deaths
People from Kresna
Members of the Internal Macedonian Revolutionary Organization
Bulgarian revolutionaries
Bulgarian people of the Balkan Wars
Macedonian Bulgarians
Assassinated Bulgarian people
People murdered in Bulgaria
Deaths by firearm in Bulgaria